The 1946 Iowa Hawkeyes football team was an American football team that represented the University of Iowa in the 1946 Big Nine Conference football season. The team compiled a 5–4 record (3–3 against conference opponents) and finished in fourth place in the Big Nine Conference. The team outscored its opponents by a combined total of 129 to 92. The team allowed an average of 200.7 yards per game, the best total defense in Iowa history.

Eddie Anderson returned as a head coach for the Hawkeyes for his fifth season as Iowa's head coach; he was inducted into the College Football Hall of Fame in 1971.

The team's statistical leaders included Bob Smith with 503 rushing yards, Emlen Tunnell with 228 passing yards, Dick Hoerner with 72 receiving yards, and Bob Sullivan with 25 points scored. Tackle Bill Kay was selected as the team's most valuable player. Guard Earl Banks and fullback Dick Hoerner were selected as first-team players on the 1946 All-Big Nine Conference football team.

The team played its home games at Iowa Stadium. It drew 197,811 spectators at five home games, an average of 39,562 per game.

Schedule

After the season

The 1947 NFL Draft was held on December 16, 1946. The following Hawkeyes were selected.

References

Iowa
Iowa Hawkeyes football seasons
Iowa Hawkeyes football